The casino computer virus is a malicious virus that upon running the infected file, copies the File Allocation Tables (FATs) to random-access memory (RAM), then deletes the FAT from the hard disk. It challenges the user to a game of Jackpot of which they have 5 credits to play with, hence the name. No matter if they win or lose, the computer shuts down, thereby making them have to reinstall their DOS. The message it shows when it challenges you read(s):

The casino computer virus activates on the 15th of January, April, August.

In popular culture 
In 2021, the virus was featured in the A Virus, Heartbreak and a World of Possibilities episode of Young Sheldon.

See also 
Comparison of computer viruses

Sources

External links 

 Internet Archive-hosted version of the virus

DOS file viruses